The 2010–11 season will be Debreceni VSC's 33rd competitive season, 18th consecutive season in the Soproni Liga and 108th year in existence as a football club.

Team kit and logo
The team kits for the 2010–11 season are produced by Adidas and the shirt sponsor is TEVA. The home kit is red colour and the away kit is white colour.

Squad

First-team squad

Updated 18 March 2011.

European Cups squad
Updated 16 September 2010.

Transfers

Summer

In:

Out:

Winter

In:

Out:

List of Hungarian football transfer summer 2010
List of Hungarian football transfer winter 2010

Club

Coaching staff

Top scorers
Includes all competitive matches. The list is sorted by shirt number when total goals are equal.

Last updated on 22 May 2011

Disciplinary record
Includes all competitive matches. Players with 1 card or more included only.

Last updated on 22 May 2011

Overall
{|class="wikitable"
|-
|Games played || 51 (30 Soproni Liga, 12 European Cups, 3 Hungarian Cup and 6 Hungarian League Cup)
|-
|Games won || 19  (12 Soproni Liga, 4 European Cups, 0 Hungarian Cup and 3 Hungarian League Cup)
|-
|Games drawn ||  13  (10 Soproni Liga, 1 European Cups, 2 Hungarian Cup and 0 Hungarian League Cup)
|-
|Games lost ||  19  (8 Soproni Liga, 7 European Cups, 2 Hungarian Cup and 2 Hungarian League Cup)
|-
|Goals scored || 74
|-
|Goals conceded || 77
|-
|Goal difference || −3
|-
|Yellow cards || 100
|-
|Red cards || 10
|-
|rowspan="1"|Worst discipline ||  Luis Ramos (14 , 1 )
|-
|rowspan="3"|Best result || 6–2 (H) v Kecskeméti TE – Nemzeti Bajnokság I – 14-08-2010
|-
| 4–0 (H) v Kecskeméti TE – Nemzeti Bajnokság I – 07-11-2010
|-
| 5–1 (A) v Vasas SC – Nemzeti Bajnokság I – 23-04-2011
|-
|rowspan="1"|Worst result || 0–5 (H) v FC Metalist Kharkiv – UEFA Europa League – 16-09-2010
|-
|rowspan="1"|Most appearances ||   Adamo Coulibaly (44 appearances)
|-
|rowspan="1"|Top scorer ||   Adamo Coulibaly (19 goals)
|-
|Points || 70/153 (45.75%)
|-

Nemzeti Bajnokság I

Classification

Results summary

Results by round

Matches

Debreceni VSC: Verpecz – Z. Nagy, Simac, I. Szűcs, Korhut – Bódi, Ramos, Rezes (Czvitkovics 61.), T. Kulcsár (Dombi 56.) – Kabát (B. Farkas 56.), P. Szilágyi. Coach: András Herczeg.
Lombard-Pápa TFC: L. Szűcs – G. Tóth, A. Farkas, Supic (P. Bíró 33.), Rajnay – Zulevs, Gyömbér, Bárányos (Jovánczai 46.), N. Heffler (Germán 59.), N. Tóth – Abwo. Coach: György Véber.
G.: P. Szilágyi (18.), T. Kulcsár (32.)
Y.: Rajnay (64.), A. Farkas (82.)

Paksi SE: A. Kovács (Csernyánszki 46.) – Fiola, Sifter, J. Szabó, T. Csehi – Bartha, T. Heffler, Lisztes (Dudás 46.; Haraszti 78.), Sipeki – Montvai, T. Kiss. Coach: Károly Kis.
Debreceni VSC: Malinauskas – Z. Nagy, Simac, Komlósi, Laczkó – Bódi, Ramos, P. Szakály (Spitzmüller 46.), Yannick – P. Szilágyi (B. Farkas 73.), Kabát (Coulibaly 65.). Coach: András Herczeg.
G.: Montvai (5.), T. Heffler (84. – pen) – Kabát (4.), Simac (40.)
Y.: Fiola (16.), Bartha (87.) – Komlósi (54.), Ramos (83.)
R.: Yannick (21.)

Debreceni VSC: Malinauskas – Komlósi, Bernáth, Mijadinoski, Laczkó – T. Kulcsár (J. Varga 53.), Czvitkovics, Z. Kiss, P. Szakály (Dombi 76.) – Coulibaly, Kabát. Coach: András Herczeg.
Kecskeméti TE: Holczer – Némedi (A. Simon 64.), B. Balogh, Lambulic, I. Farkas – Bori, Litsingi, Ebala, Savic (Cukic 46.) – Csordás (Foxi 46.), Tököli. Coach: István Urbányi.
G.: Z. Kiss (18.), Coulibaly (33.), Czvitkovics (47., 84.), Kabát (86.), Dombi (91.) – Foxi (49., 74.)
Y.: Ebala (75.), Cukic (87.), Holczer (91.)
R.: Z. Kiss (87.) – Tököli (77.)

Budapest Honvéd FC: Kemenes – Takács, Botis, Cuerda, Hajdú – Danilo (Bojtor 88.), Coira, Rufino, Akassou, Sadjo – Rouani (Abass 85.). Coach: Massimo Morales.
Debreceni VSC: Malinauskas – Nagy, Simac, Szűcs, Fodor – Kulcsár (Ramos 46.), Spitzmüller, Bódi, Rezes – Farkas (Coulibaly 46.), Szilágyi (Balajti 63.). Coach: András Herczeg.
G.: Coira (22.)
Y.: Akassou (25.), Rufino (77.) – Fodor (37.), Spitzmüller (85.)

Debreceni VSC: Malinauskas – Bernáth (Dombi 22.), Komlósi, Mijadinoski, Laczkó – Czvitkovics, Kiss (Ramos 46.), Varga, Szakály – Coulibaly, Yannick. Coach: András Herczeg.
Videoton FC: Tujvel – Lázár (Nikolic 75.), Horváth, Vaskó, Lipták, Hidvégi – Nagy, Sándor, Elek, Polonkai (Vasiljevic 62.) – Alves. Coach: György Mezey.
G.: Czvitkovics (68. – pen.), Yannick (71.), Horváth (90. – og) – Sándor (55.)
Y.: Laczkó (67.) – Alves (36.), Nagy (38.), Horváth (67.), Vaskó (78.)

Győri ETO FC: Stevanovic – Babic, Fehér, Szabó, Völgyi – Tokody, Ji-Paraná (Dinjar 57.), Pilibaitis, Koltai (Cetkovic 80.) – Ceolin (Trajkovic 70.), Aleksidze. Coach: Attila Pintér.
Debreceni VSC: Malinauskas – Nagy (Farkas 37.), Komlósi, Mijadinoski, Laczkó – Czvitkovics, Kiss, Varga, Szakály (Dombi 67.) – Coulibaly (Rezes 75.), Yannick. Coach: András Herczeg.
G.: Koltai (7., 67.), Aleksidze (87.)
Y.: Ji-Paraná (38.), Aleksidze (43.) – Nagy (34.), Komlósi (43.), Varga (84.)
R:: Farkas (42.)

Debreceni VSC: Malinauskas – Varga, Fodor, Komlósi, Laczkó – Bódi (Dombi 68.), Czvitkovics, Ramos, Szakály – Kabát, Yannick (Szilágyi 73.). Coach: András Herczeg.
Újpest FC: Balajcza – Szokol (Kiss 40.), Vermes, Takács, Pollák – Simon, Mitrovic, Egerszegi, Böőr (Simek 46.) – Rajczi (Matos 51.), Tisza. Coach: Géza Mészöly.
G.: Laczkó (75.) – Simek (73.)
Y.: Laczkó (22.), Komlósi (78.) – Mitrovic (15.)

BFC Siófok: Molnár – Mogyorósi, Fehér, Graszl, Novák – Homma, Tusori, Kecskés (Ludánszki 68.), Lukács (Piller 73.) – Sowunmi (Délczeg 86.), Ivancsics. Coach: István Mihalecz.
Debreceni VSC: Malinauskas – Varga, Komlósi, Máté, Laczkó – Czvitkovics (Dombi 64.), Bódi, Ramos, Szakály – Coulibaly (Szilágyi 46.), Kabát (Yannick 46.). Coach: András Herczeg.
G.: Tusori (11., 44.), Sowunmi (19., 28.) – Szakály (50. – pen.)
Y.: Lukács (56.), Sowunmi (63.), Fehér (65.), Homma (65.) – Varga (37.), Laczkó (42.), Ramos (85.)

Debreceni VSC: Malinauskas – Nagy (Ramos 60.), Mijadinoski, Simac, Laczkó – Czvitkovics, Kiss, Varga, Szakály – Coulibaly (Kabát 61.), Yannick (Dombi 80.). Coach: András Herczeg.
Vasas SC: Végh – Arnaut (Polényi 53.), Mileusnic, Gáspár, Katona (Balog 29.) – Arsic (Loussaief 64.), Kovács, Pavicevic, Németh – Ferenczi, Lázok. Coach: Giovanni Dellacasa.
G.: Coulibaly (14., 17. – pen.), Kabát (68.) – Ferenczi (80.)
Y.: Kabát (81.) – Arsic (52.), Németh (69.)

MTK Budapest FC: Szatmári – Vukadinovic, Szekeres, Sütő (Kelemen 78.), Vadnai – Kanta, Vukmir, Á. Szabó (Eppel 92.), Pátkai, Könyves (Csiki 66.) – Tischler. Coach: József Garami.
Debreceni VSC: Malinauskas – Nagy, Simac, Mijadinoski, Laczkó – Szakály (Szilágyi 69.), Kiss, Varga, Czvitkovics – Coulibaly (Kabát 46.), Yannick (Kulcsár 46.). Coach: András Herczeg.
G.: —
Y.: Vukadinovic (43.), Tischler (53.), Sütő (61.) – Varga (79.), Kiss (90.), Simac (92.)

Debreceni VSC: Malinauskas – Nagy, Simac, Mijadinoski, Fodor – Czvitkovics, Bódi (Dombi 78.), Varga, Szakály (Coulibaly 74.) – Kabát, Yannick (Kiss 66.). Coach: András Herczeg.
Ferencvárosi TC: Ranilovic – Adriano (Miljkovic 64.), Csizmadia, BAlog (Stockley 81.), Rodenbücher – Andrezinho, Józsi (Tóth 71.), Stanic, Rósa – Heinz, Schembri. Coach: László Prukner.
G.: Kabát (5. – pen.), Czvitkovics (88.) – Rodenbücher (75.)
Y.: Kabát (15.) – Rósa (30.), Schembri (50.)
R.: Kabát (58.)

Debreceni VSC: Malinauskas – Nagy, Mijadinoski, Simac, Fodor – Czvitkovics, Bódi (Dombi 55.), Varga, Szakály – Coulibaly (Szilágyi 66.), Yannick (Kiss 73.). Coach: András Herczeg.
Kaposvári Rákóczi FC: Kovács – Grúz, Okuka, Zsók, Kovácsevics – Kulcsár (Godslove 76.), Pedro, Oláh, Hegedűs, Jawad (Balázs 70.) – Peric. Coach: Tibor Sisa.
G.: Bódi (36.), Czvitkovics (71., 75.) – Oláh (43.)
Y.: Simac (31.) – Kulcsár (38.), Grúz (70.), Pedro (77.)

Debreceni VSC: Malinauskas – Bernáth, Simac, Mijadinoski, Laczkó – Czvitkovics, Varga, Szakály, Yannick (Bódi 68.) – Coulibaly, Szilágyi (Dombi 46.). Coach: András Herczeg.
Szolnoki MÁV FC: Rézsó – Molnár, Antal, Balogh, Cornaci – Koós (Alex 70.), Szalai, Remili, Hevesi-Tóth, Tchami (Lengyel 79.) – Pisanjuk (Vörös 46.). Coach: Antal Simon.
G.: Szakály (56., 70.), Coulibaly (83.), Simac (90.+1)
Y.: —

Debreceni VSC: Malinauskas – Nagy, Simac, Mijadinoski, Laczkó – Czvitkovics, Bódi (Dombi 56.), Varga, Szakály – Coulibaly (Kabát 71.), Yannick (Kiss 56.). Coach: András Herczeg.
Zalaegerszegi TE: Vlaszák – Kocsárdi (Rajcomar 59.), Miljatovic, Varga, Panikvar – Szalai, Barna (Horváth 46.), Kamber, Delic (Cebara 78.), Balázs – Simon. Coach: János Csank.
G.: Varga (6. – og.), Coulibaly (22.) – Simon (52.)
Y.: Varga (31.), Dombi (92.) – Szalai (38.), Rajcomar (59.), Panikvar (71.), Kamber (79.), Horváth (88.)

Szombathelyi Haladás: Rózsa – Schimmer, Guzmics, Korolovszky, Tóth – Lattenstein (Csontos 46.), Á. Simon, Irhás – Nagy, Oross (Rajos 80.), Fodrek (A. Simon 89.). Coach: Zoltán Aczél.
Debreceni VSC: Malinauskas – Nagy, Komlósi, Mijadinoski, Fodor (Rezes 27.) – Szakály (Szilágyi 46.), Varga, Czvitkovics, Kiss (Dombi 60.), Laczkó – Coulibaly. Coach: András Herczeg.
G.: Fodrek (3., 45.), Tóth (72. – pen.)
Y.: Á. Simon (34.), Fodrek (70.), Oross (77.), Korolovszky (82.) – Kiss (25.), Rezes (41.), Komlósi (52.), Mijadinoski (65.), Malinauskas (71.)

Lombard-Pápa TFC: Szűcs – Dlusztus, Farkas, Supic, Rajnay – Quintero, Gyömbér, Takács (Zulevs 61.) – N. Tóth, Abwo, Palkó (Jovánczai 64.). Coach: György Véber.
Debreceni VSC: Verpecz – Nagy, Komlósi (Fodor 43.), Mijadinoski, Laczkó – Bódi (Dombi 60.), Czvitkovics, Varga, Szakály – Kabát, Yannick (Szilágyi 54.). Coach: András Herczeg.
G.: Rajnay (84.) – Mijadinoski (71.)
Y.: Farkas (20.) – Varga (21.), Bódi (41.), Laczkó (56.), Fodor (76.)
R.: Fodor (90.)

Debreceni VSC: Novakovic – Bernáth, Simac, Mijadinoski, Fodor – Czvitkovics, Varga, Ramos (Dombi 70.), Szakály (Yannick 57.) – Salami (Coulibaly 62.), Kabát. Coach: Zdenek Scasny.
Paksi SE: Csernyánszki – Heffler, Éger, Fiola, Csehi – Kiss (Magasföldi 64.), Sifter, Sipeki, Bartha (Haraszti 85.) – Montvai (Vayer 64.), Böde. Coach: Károly Kis.
G.: Éger (59. – o.g.), Czvitkovics (83. – pen.) – Éger (57.)
Y.: Czvitkovics (40.), Fodor (43.), Varga (70.) – Éger (50.), Fiola (79.), Sipeki (90.)

Kecskeméti TE: Rybánsky – Ebala, Radanovic, Balogh, Mohl – Alempijevic, Cukic (Bertus 76.), Foxi – Litsingi (Savic 57.), Tököli, Vujovic (Bori 65.). Coach: Tomislav Sivic.
Debreceni VSC: Novakovic – Bernáth, Simac, Mijadinoski, Nikolov – Szakály (Dombi 55.), Ramos, Czvitkovics, Illés (Farkas 73.) – Kabát (Coulibaly 62.), Salami. Coach: Zdenek Scasny.
G.: Balogh (35. – pen.), Vujovic (36. – pen.), Salami (39. – o.g.)
Y.: Alempijevic (31.), Cukic (61.) – Ramos (33.), Nikolov (34.), Czvitkovics (40.), Illés (48.), Farkas (89.)

Debreceni VSC: Novakovic – Bernáth, Simac, Mijadinoski, Fodor – Czvitkovics, Varga, Ramos (Salami 46.), Szakály (Dombi 77.) – Kabát, Yannick (Farkas 62.). Coach: Zdenek Scasny.
Budapest Honvéd FC: Kemenes – Lovric, Debreceni, Botis, Hajdú – G. Nagy (Sadjo 78.), Akassou (Hidi 46.), Zelenka (Moreira 52.), Horváth, Ivancsics – Danilo. Coach: Attila Supka.
G.: Czvitkovics (45.), Salami (47.) – Debreceni (21.), Hajdú (62.)
Y.: Bernáth (78.) – Hidi (65.), Lovric (75.)

Videoton FC Fehérvár: Bozovic – Lázár, Lipták, Vaskó, Andic – Vasiljevic (Szakály 59.), Sándor, Polonkai (Elek 46.) – Gosztonyi (Milanovic 80.), Alves, Lencse. Coach: György Mezey.
Debreceni VSC: Novakovic – Bernáth (Nikolov 69.), Mijadinoski, Komlósi, Mardare (Fodor 78.) – Czvitkovics, Ramos (Salami 64.), Varga, Szakály – Coulibaly, Illés. Coach: Zdenek Scasny.
G.: Lencse (61.), Alves (72.) – Coulibaly (65.)
Y.: Gosztonyi (79.) – Szakály (32.), Ramos (60.), Varga (86.)

Debreceni VSC: Verpecz – Bernáth, Komlósi, Mijadinoski, Mardare – Czvitkovics, Varga, Bódi, Szakály – Coulibaly, Illés (Kabát 68.). Coach: Zdenek Scasny.
Győri ETO FC: Stevanovic – Takács, Fehér, Dordevic, Völgyi – Dinjar (Dudás 86.), Kiss, Pilibaitis, Ji-Paraná, Koltai (Ceolin 74.) – Aleksidze (Bouguerra 79.). Coach: Aurél Csertői.
G.: Czvitkovics (50. – pen.) – Dinjar (60.)
Y.: Bernáth (75.), Mardare (80.), Kabát (87.) – Pilibaitis (49.), Ceolin (84.), Dudás (91.)

Újpest FC: Balajcza – Szokol, Rubus, Takács, Pollák – Böőr, Mitrovic, Tajthy (Barczi 79.), Balogh (Magos 76.) – Lázár (Sitku 87.), Ahjupera. Coach: Géza Mészöly.
Debreceni VSC: Verpecz – Bernáth, Komlósi, Mijadinoski, Mardare – Czvitkovics, Varga (Dombi 54.), Ramos, Yannick (Szakály 78.) – Salami (Bódi 30.), Coulibaly. Coach: Zdenek Scasny.
G.: Ahjupera (45., 82.) – Coulibaly (12.), Czvitkovics (64. – pen.)
Y.: Tajthy (71.) – Varga (43.), Mijadinoski (46.), Ramos (52.), Coulibaly (90.)

Debreceni VSC: Verpecz – Bernáth (Kabát 80.), Komlósi, Mijadinoski, Mardare (Dombi 72.) – Czvitkovics, Varga, Bódi, Yannick – Salami (Simac 46.), Coulibaly. Coach: Zdenek Scasny.
BFC Siófok: Molnár – Mogyorósi, Graszl, Fehér, Novák – Lukács (Ludánszki 92.), Tusori, Kecskés, Melczer – Homma (Csordás 81.), Délczeg (Csermelyi 72.). Coach: István Mihalecz.
G.: Coulibaly (55.), Bódi (59.) – Délczeg (14.), Homma (45.), Tusori (52.)
Y.: Mardare (16.), Varga (30.) – Délczeg (8.), Graszl (58.), Lukács (80.)
R.: Mijadinoski (45.)

Vasas SC: G. Németh – Balog (N. Németh 46.), Gáspár, Mileusnic, Katona – Kulcsár, Kovács, Lisztes (Ponczók 46.), Lázok – Ferenczi, Beliczky (Arsic 75.). Coach: András Komjáti.
Debreceni VSC: Verpecz – Bernáth, Simac, Szűcs, Fodor – Szakály (Farkas 67.), Ramos, Czvitkovics (Kabát 80.), Bódi, Yannick – Coulibaly (Spitzmüller 83.). Coach: Elemér Kondás.
G.: N. Németh (70.) – Simac (24.), Bódi (31., 54.), Coulibaly (47., 81.)
Y.: Kovács (74.), N. Németh (87.)

Debreceni VSC: Novakovic – Bernáth (Nagy 15.), Simac, Szűcs, Fodor – Bódi, Czvitkovics (Spitzmüller 65.), Ramos, Szakály, Yannick (Farkas 72.) – Coulibaly. Coach: Elemér Kondás.
MTK Budapest FC: Szatmári (Hegedűs 30.) – Hajdú, Szekeres, Sütő, Ladányi – Könyves, Wolfe, Kanta (Nikházi 60.), Pátkai, Tischler (A. Pál 46.) – Hrepka. Coach: József Garami.
G.: Simac (27.), Ramos (28.), Coulibaly (75.) – Pátkai (15.)
Y.: —

Ferencvárosi TC: Haber – Csizmadia, Tutoric, Balog – Junior, Morales (Tóth 57.), Maróti (Józsi 19.), Rósa (Miljkovic 63.) – Schembri, Heinz, Abdi. Coach: László Prukner.
Debreceni VSC: Novakovic – Nagy, Simac, Mijadinoski, Fodor – Bódi (Dombi 84.), Ramos (Spitzmüller 78.), Varga, Szakály, Yannick (Farkas 92.) – Coulibaly. Coach: Elemér Kondás.
G.: Mijadinoski (84. – o.g.) – Coulibaly (56.)
Y.: Morales (28.), Balog (36.), Tóth (59.), Heinz (79.) – Szakály (33.), Coulibaly (40.), Bódi (76.), Ramos (77.), Dombi (90.)

Kaposvári Rákóczi FC: Kovács – Okuka, Bank, Zsók, Gujic – Pavlovic (Farkas 89.), Hegedűs, Pedro, Balázs – Oláh (Jawad 83.), Peric (Grumic 70.). Coach: Tibor Sisa.
Debreceni VSC: Novakovic – Nagy, Simac, Mijadinoski, Fodor – Kulcsár (Illés 63.), Bódi (Salami 89.), Ramos, Yannick (Dombi 81.) – Szakály, Coulibaly. Coach: Elemér Kondás.
G.: —
Y.: Okuka (38.) – Bódi (32.), Illés (71.), Coulibaly (72.)

Szolnoki MÁV FC: Melnichenko – Milicic, Szalai (Ngalle 70.), Durovic, Vukomanovic – Fitos (Tchami 46.), Némedi, Jokic (Gosic 77.), Búrány – Zsolnai, Lengyel. Coach: Antal Simon.
Debreceni VSC: Novakovic (Verpecz 61.) – Nikolov, Simac, Szűcs (Mijadinoski 5.), Fodor – Szakály, Bódi (Nagy 83.), Ramos, Illés – Farkas, Coulibaly. Coach: Elemér Kondás.
G.: Tchami (49.) – Szakály (9.), Coulibaly (19.)
Y.: Durovic (43.), Szalai (63.), Némedi (91.) – Ramos (64.)

Zalaegerszegi TE: Vlaszák – Kocsárdi, Bogunovic, Miljatovic, Panikvar – Horváth (Simonfalvi 65.), Kamber, Szalai, Balázs (Simon 85.) – Turkovs, Rajcomar (I. Delic 46.). Coach: János Csank.
Debreceni VSC: Verpecz – Nagy, Simac, Mijadinoski, Fodor – Bódi, Ramos, Szakály (Salami 77.), Illés (Czvitkovics 56.) – Coulibaly, Yannick. Coach: Elemér Kondás.
G.: Ramos (71. – o.g.) – Bódi (69. – pen.)
Y.: Bogunovic (33.), Kamber (44.), Panikvar (65.), Miljatovic (68.) – Nagy (51.), Ramos (90.)

Debreceni VSC: Verpecz – Nagy, Simac, Mijadinoski, Fodor – Bódi, Ramos (Salami 69.), Szakály (Czvitkovics 44.), Illés (Varga 59.) – Coulibaly, Yannick. Coach: Elemér Kondás.
Szombathelyi Haladás: Rózsa – Schimmer (Jagodics 30.), Guzmics, Lengyel (Csontos 82.), Rajos (Farkas 46.) – Nagy I, Iszlai, Sipos, Halmosi – Fodrek, Oross. Coach: Zoltán Aczél.
G.: Coulibaly (26. – pen.) – Iszlai (57.), Halmosi (67.)
Y.: Szakály (32.), Illés (49.), Ramos (65.) – Iszlai (27.), Lengyel (59.), Oross (87.)

Magyar kupa

Fourth round

Nagyecsed RSE: Makó – Patály, Ricsei, Doros, Tősér – Acsillán, Kovács, Bancsi, Balogh (Csáki 99.) – Katona (Szakács 98.), Marcsek (Bulyáki 91.). Coach: Tamás Feczkó.
Debreceni VSC: Verpecz – Bernáth, Máté, Szűcs, Korhut – Kulcsár (Szilágyi 46.), Ramos, Lucas (Kardos 86.), Pavlovic – Kabát, Vinicius (Spitzmüller 54.). Coach: András Herczeg.
G.: Marcsek (42.) – Szilágyi (53.)
Y.: Bancsi (64.), Doros (92.) – Pavlovic (10.), Szűcs (59.), Lucas (63.), Máté (92.)
R.: Ramos (41.)

Fifth round

First leg

Debreceni VSC: Verpecz – Bernáth, Komlósi, Máté, Korhut – Bódi, Spitzmüller, Kiss, Pavlovic (Szűcs 51.) – Kabát (Laczkó 57.), Szilágyi (Coulibaly 64.). Coach: András Herczeg.
Kecskeméti TE – Ereco: Rybánsky – Némedi, Gyagya, Balogh, Mohl – Litsingi (Bori 56.), Ebala (Csordás 74.), Cukic (Savic 54.), Alempijevic – Tököli, Foxi. Coach: Tomislav Sivic.
G.: Litsingi (23.), Alempijevic (43., 50.)
Y.: Kabát (40.) – Némedi (61.), Alempijevic (64.), Bori (90.)
R.: Máté (47.)

Second leg

Kecskeméti TE: Rybánsky – Gyagya, Ebala, Balogh, Mohl (Farkas 79.) – Urbán, Cukic, Bertus, Bori – Litsingi (Savic 69.), Tököli (Foxi 46.). Coach: Tomislav Sivic.
Debreceni VSC: Verpecz – Bernáth, Simac, Mijadinoski, Fodor – Spitzmüller (Coulibaly 69.), Varga, Czvitkovics, Szakály (Bódi 60.) – Farkas (Yannick 46.), Kabát. Coach: Zdenek Scasny.
G.: Tököli (13.), Litsingi (35.), Foxi (81.) – Kabát (45.)
Y.: Ebala (75.)

Kecskeméti TE won 6–1 on aggregate.

League Cup

Quarter-final

First leg 

Debreceni VSC: Verpecz – Nagy, Komlósi, Szűcs, Fodor – Bódi (Szakály 76.), Varga, Spitzmüller (Ramos 46.), Vinícius (Salami 46.) – Illés (Mokánszki 88.), Coulibaly (Yannick 46.). Coach: Zdenek Scasny.
Kecskeméti TE: Rybánsky – Gyagya (Preklet 64.), Radanovic, Balogh (Urbán 86.), Mohl – Savic (Ebala 64.), Alempijevic, Bertus (Cukic 46.), Bori (Litsingi 46.) – Tököli, Foxi. Coach: Tomislav Sivic.
G.: Varga (24.), Illés (65.)
Y.: Ramos (74.) – Cukic (52.), Balogh (84.), Alempijevic (84.)
R.: Radanovic (90.)

Second leg

Kecskeméti TE: Akovic – Preklet, Koszó, Urbán, I. Farkas – Tölgyesi (Alempijevic 46.), Ebala, Cukic (Bertus 62.), Bori (Litsingi 46.), A. Farkas (Foxi 46.) – Vujovic (Dosso 62.). Coach: Tomislav Sivic.
Debreceni VSC: Verpecz – Nagy, Komlósi, Szűcs, Fodor – Bódi, Varga, Spitzmüller, Vinícius (Ferenczi 74.) – Coulibaly (Lucas 88.), Mokánszki (Csorba 69.). Coach: Zdenek Scasny.
G.: Litsingi (81. – pen.)
Y.: Koszó (26.), Ebala (30.), Foxi (58.), Vujovic (59.), Alempijevic (89.) – Mokánszki (17.), Fodor (18.)
R.: I. Farkas (41.) – Nagy (80.)

Debreceni VSC won 2–1 on aggregate.

Semi-final

First leg 

Szombathelyi Haladás: Rózsa – Schimmer (Csontos 35.), G. I Nagy, Korolovszky, P. Tóth – Sluka, Molnár (Lattenstein 70.), Irhás (Sipos 58.), Halmosi – Fodrek, Oross (G. II Nagy 66.). Coach: Zoltán Aczél.
Debreceni VSC: Verpecz – Nikolov, Mijadinoski, Szűcs, Fodor – Farkas (Szakály 40.), Ramos (Lucas 78.), Bódi, Yannick (Mokánszki 70.) – Salami (Dombi 40.), Coulibaly. Coach: Zdenek Scasny.
G.: Coulibaly (45. – pen., 62.)
Y.: G. I Nagy (44.), P. Tóth (61.), Csontos (84.) – Yannick (8.), Ramos (71.), Fodor (85.)

Second leg

Debreceni VSC: Novakovic – Nagy, Simac, Szűcs, Fodor (Kabát 46.) – Kulcsár (Nikolov 46.), Spitzmüller, Bódi, Yannick (Dombi 59.) – Mokánszki (Coulibaly 55.), Farkas (Szakály 75.). Coach: Zdenek Scasny.
Szombathelyi Haladás: Mursits – Csontos, Lengyel, Jagodics, Iszlai – G. II Nagy (Skriba 71.), Molnár (Kovács 75.), Rajos, Sipos, Lattenstein (Ugrai 85.) – A. Simon (Gyurján 59.). Coach: Zoltán Aczél.
G.: —
Y.: Spitzmüller (47.)

Debreceni VSC won 2–0 on aggregate.

Final

First leg 

Debreceni VSC: Novakovic – Bernáth, Simac, Mijadinoski, Mardare – Czvitkovics (Farkas 83.), Varga, Ramos, Yannick – Salami (Bódi 70.), Coulibaly. Coach: Zdenek Scasny.
Paksi SE: Csernyánszki – Heffler, Gévay, Fiola, Szabó – Bartha (Magasföldi 46.), Sifter, Sipeki (Böde 46.), Haraszti (Montvai 46.) – Vári (Nagy 81.), Kiss (Mészáros 60.). Coach: Károly Kis.
G.: Salami (14.), Yannick (41.) – Vári (23. – pen.)
Y.: Simac (27.), Yannick (60.), Ramos (70.), Farkas (90.) – Sifter (6.), Gévay (25.), Sipeki (31.), Fiola (91.)

Second leg

Paksi SE: Pokorni – Mészáros, Éger, Fiola, Szabó – Bartha, Sifter, Sipeki (Heffler 83.), Böde (Bohner 51.), Magasföldi – Kiss. Coach: Károly Kis.
Debreceni VSC: Novakovic – Nagy, Simac, Komlósi, Nikolov (Fodor 46.) – Kulcsár (Etogo 58.), Ramos, Bódi, Farkas (Spitzmüller 68.) – Kabát, Mokánszki (Yannick 46.). Coach: Zdenek Scasny.
G.: Magasföldi (35., 72.), Bartha (65.)
Y.: Kabát (12.), Nikolov (34.), Simac (60.), Ramos (89.)

Paksi SE won 4–2 on Ligakupa.

UEFA Champions League

Qualifying round

Second qualifying round

First leg

FC Levadia Tallinn: Kaalma – Podholjuzin, Kalimullin, Morozov, Teniste – Nunes, Nakh, Malov, Leitan – Neemelo (Dmitrjev 76.), Ivanov. Coach: Igor Prins.
Debreceni VSC: Malinauskas – Nagy, Komlósi, Mijadinoski, Fodor – Czvitkovics, Kiss (Dombi 78.), Bódi (Yannick 61.), Szakály – Kabát (Rezes 69.), Coulibaly. Coach: András Herczeg.
G.: Neemelo (59.) – Rezes (90.)
Y.: Morozov (54.) – Komlósi (6.), Nagy (30.), Fodor (63.)

Second leg

Debreceni VSC: Malinauskas – Fodor, Komlósi, Mijadinoski, Nagy – Czvitkovics, Kiss, Kulcsár (Rezes 46.), Szakály (Varga 73.) – Coulibaly, Yannick (Dombi 85.). Coach: András Herczeg.
FC Levadia Tallinn: Kaalma – Kalimullin, Morozov, Podholjuzin – Nunes (Subbotin 80.), Ivanov, Leitan, Malov, Nakh – Neemelo. Coach: Igor Prins.
G.: Coulibaly (24.), Yannick (32.), Szakály (55.) – Nakh (3.), Leitan (53.)
Y.: Rezes (57.) – Malov (45.+1), Morozov (47.), Nakh (60.), Kalimullin (67.)
R.: Malov (74.)
Debrecen won 4–3 on aggregate.

Third qualifying round

First leg

Debreceni VSC: Verpecz – Mijadinoski, Bernáth, Fodor, Komlósi – Czvitkovics, Kiss, Rezes (Farkas 55.), Varga – Yannick (Dombi 75.), Coulibaly. Coach: András Herczeg.
FC Basel: Costanzo – Safari (Tembo 62.), Abraham, Atan, Inkoom – Huggel, Stocker (Xhaka 89.), Shaqiri, Cabral – Frei, Zoua (Almerares 76.). Coach: Thorsten Fink.
G.: Stocker (34.), Xhaka (90.+2)
Y.: Cabral (50.), Stocker (84.)

Second leg

FC Basel: Costanzo – Inkoom, Abraham, Atan, Safari – Shaqiri, Huggel (Xhaka 87.), Yapi-Yapo (Cabral 77.), Tembo – Zoua, Chipperfield (Almerares). Coach: Thorsten Fink.
Debreceni VSC: Verpecz – Bernáth, Komlósi, Mijadinoski, Laczkó – Kiss, Czvitkovics (B. Farkas 81.), J. Varga – T. Kulcsár (Bódi 67.), Coulibaly, Yannick (Kabát 67.). Coach: András Herczeg.
G.: Atan (26.), Chipperfield (59., Shaqiri (64.) – Coulibaly (74.)
Y.: Inkoom (11.)
FC Basel won 5–1 on aggregate.

UEFA Europa League

Qualifying round

Play-off round

First leg

Debreceni VSC: Malinauskas – Bernáth, Komlósi, Mijadinoski, Laczkó – Czvitkovics, Varga, Kiss, Szakály (Dombi 76.) – Kabát (Farkas 81.), Coulibaly (Yannick 86.). Coach: András Herczeg.
PFC Litex Lovech: Golubovic – Berberovic, Barthe, Petkov, Venkov – Wellington (Tsvetanov 78.), Tsvetkov, Yelenkovich, Sandrinho (Todorov 66.), Milanov – Niflore (Yanev 71.). Coach: Petko Petkov.
G.: Coulibaly (22.), Laczkó (33.)
Y.: Bernáth (76.), Varga (90.+1) – Barthe (35.)
R.: Barthe (69.)

Second leg

PFC Litex Lovech: Vinicius – Bodurov, Nikolov, Petkov, Zanev – Wellington (Da Silva 61.), Milanov (Bratu 61.), Yelenkovich (Tsvetkov 83.), Sandrinho, Yanev – Niflore. Coach: Petko Petkov.
Debreceni VSC: Malinauskas – Bernáth, Komlósi, Mijadinoski, Laczkó – Czvitkovics, Varga (Máté 90.), Kiss, Szakály (Dombi 74.) – Kabát (Yannick 50.), Coulibaly. Coach: András Herczeg.
G.: Niflore (68.) – Yannick (53.), Czvitkovics (81.)
Y.: Laczkó (24.), Mijadinoski (58.)

Debrecen won 4–1 on aggregate.

Group stage

Debreceni VSC: Malinauskas – Nagy, Komlósi, Mijadinoski, Laczkó – Szakály (Rezes 65.), Varga, Kiss (Ramos 46.), Czvitkovics – Kabát, Yannick (Coulibaly 46.). Coach: András Herczeg.
FC Metalist Kharkiv: Disljenkovic – Villagra, Obradovic, Gueye (Bordain 80.), Pshenychnykh – Valyayev, Taison (Kaita 77.), Edmar, Xavier – Fininho, Vorobey (Oliynyk 55.). Coach: Myron Markevich.
G.: Edmar (24., 74.), Xavier (34.), Fininho (77.), Valyayev (89.)
Y.: Nagy (66.) – Villagra (41.), Fininho (45.+1)
R.: Kabát (42.)

UC Sampdoria: Curci – Cacciatore (Zauri 73.), Volta, Lucchini, Accardi – Koman (Marilungo 80.), Palombo, Dessena, Mannini (Guberti 58.) – Pazzini, Cassano. Coach: Domenico Di Carlo.
Debreceni VSC: Malinauskas – Nagy, Simac, Mijadinoski, Laczkó – Szakály (Kulcsár 46.), Kiss, Varga, Czvitkovics, Yannick (Bódi 87.) – Coulibaly. Coach: András Herczeg.
G.: Pazzini (18. – pen.)
Y.: Lucchini (57.) – Laczkó (18.), Mijadinoski (18.), Kiss (61.)

Debreceni VSC: Malinauskas – Nagy, Simac, Mijadinoski, Fodor – Szakály (Rezes 79.), Varga, Kiss, Czvitkovics, Yannick (Bódi 66.) – Coulibaly. Coach: András Herczeg.
PSV Eindhoven: Isaksson – Hutchinson, Bouma, Marcelo, Pieters – Afellay, Toivonen (Bakkal 84.), Engelaar – Lens (Reis 46.), Berg, Dzsudzsák. Coach: Myron Markevich.
G.: Mijadinoski (35.) – Engelaar (40.), Dzsudzsák (66.)
Y.: Berg (34.)

PSV Eindhoven: Isaksson – Hutchinson, Marcelo, Bouma (Rodríguez 46.), Pieters (Wuytens 77.) – Lens (Bakkal 64.), Afellay, Engelaar – Toivonen, Reis, Dzsudzsák. Coach: Fred Rutten.
Debreceni VSC: Malinauskas – Nagy, Simac, Mijadinoski, Laczkó – Bódi (Dombi 73.), Varga, Kiss, Czvitkovics, Szakály – Coulibaly. Coach: András Herczeg.
G.: Afellay (22.), Reis (44.), Wuytens (77.)
Y.: Bouma (38.) – Laczkó (64.), Mijadinoski (90.)

FC Metalist Kharkiv: Startsev – Villagra, Obradovic, Gueye, Pshenychnyk – Bordian (Lysenko 46.; Shelayev 90.+4), Oliynyk, Valyayev, Xavier, Edmar – Devic (Vorobey 73.). Coach: Myron Markevich.
Debreceni VSC: Malinauskas – Bernáth, Simac, Mijadinoski, Laczkó – Bódi (Yannick 55.), Kiss, Varga, Szakály (Ramos 81.), Czvitkovics – Kabát (Coulibaly 64.). Coach: András Herczeg.
G.: Bódi (52. – o.g.), Oliynyk (88.) – Czvitkovics (48.)
Y.: Edmar (57.), Obradovic (90.+1) – Simac (22.), Ramos (90.+1)

Debreceni VSC: Verpecz – Bernáth, Simac, Mijadinoski, Laczkó – Bódi (Dombi 89.), Varga, Czvitkovics, Szakály (Fodor 91.) – Kabát, Yannick (Kiss 66.). Coach: András Herczeg.
U.C. Sampdoria: Da Costa – Grieco, Volta, Rossini, Messina – Dessena, Poli (Mannini 80.), Obiang (Guberti 71.), Koman – Krstičić (Lamorte 88.), Sammarco. Coach: Domenico Di Carlo.
G.: Kabát (58., 86.)
Y.: Bódi (78.) – Rossini (81.)

Hungarian Super Cup

Debreceni VSC: Malinauskas – Z. Nagy, Komlósi, Mijadinoski, Fodor – Bódi (J. Varga 90.+1), P. Szakály (Rezes 86.), Z. Kiss, Czvitkovics, Yannick (Kabát 56.) – Coulibaly. Coach: András Herczeg.
Videoton FC Fehlrvár: Bozovic – Lázár (Hidvégi 46.), G. Horváth, Lipták, Andic – D. Szakály (Lencse 75.), Sándor (Elek 60.), Milanovic (B. Farkas 6.), Polonkai (Djordjic 60.) – Alves, Nikolic. Coach: György Mezey.
G.: P. Szakály (66.)
Y.: Fodor (59.) – G. Horváth (49.), Lipták (88.)

References

External links
 Eufo
 DVSC 
 UEFA
 fixtures and results

2010-11
Hungarian football clubs 2010–11 season